Benjamin Lee Merkle (born 1971) is an American New Testament scholar. He is Associate Professor of New Testament and Greek at Southeastern Baptist Theological Seminary. Merkle studied at Kuyper College, Westminster Seminary California, and Southern Baptist Theological Seminary. He served as Professor of New Testament at Malaysia Baptist Theological Seminary before coming to SEBTS.

Merkle specializes in the issue of eldership, and has written The Elder and Overseer:  One Office in the Early Church (2003), 40 Questions about Elders and Deacons (2008), and  Why Elders? A Biblical and Practical Guide for Church Members (2009). He argues that elders and bishops are the same in the New Testament and "normally function in plurality in a local church."

Merkle also argues for gender distinctions on the basis of 1 Corinthians 11.

Works

Books

Edited by

References

Living people
1971 births
American biblical scholars
New Testament scholars
Westminster Seminary California alumni
Southern Baptist Theological Seminary alumni